The Aylesbury Canal Society is a waterway society on the Grand Union Canal, Buckinghamshire, England. The society was launched in 1971 to promote the use of the Aylesbury Arm, and to run moorings leased from British Waterways.

Aylesbury Basin was sold by British Waterways to Aylesbury Vale District Council in 2007. However, Aylesbury Canal Society hold the lease until 2018.

Aylesbury Arm Canal
Construction of the  Aylesbury canal from Marsworth on the Grand Junction (now Grand Union) Canal into Aylesbury started in 1811. It opened in 1814 and was used for the transport of agricultural produce and coal. Its profitability was undermined by the development of the railways from the 1840s.

 Marsworth No.1 & 2 Locks (staircase)
 Marsworth No.3 Lock
 Marsworth No.4 Black Jacks Lock
 Lock Nos.5, 6 & 7
 No.8 Jefferies Lock
 No.9 Wilstone (Gudgeon Stream)
 No.10 Puttenham Top Lock
 No.11 Puttenham Bottom Lock
 No.12 Buckland Lock
 No.13 Red House Lock
 No.14 Broughton Lock
 No.15 Osier Bed Lock (Aylesbury Lock)
 No.16 Hills and Partridges Lock (Aylesbury Lock).
There are 19 numbered over-bridges on the canal carrying roads, footpaths and farm accommodation bridges. Two bridges are named: No.2 Dixon's Gap Bridge, and No.3 Wilstone Bridge. There are three pipe bridges: one between Lock No.6 and Bridge No.2, one between Bridges Nos.15 and 16, and one between Lock No.16 and Bridge No.17.

See also
List of waterway societies in the United Kingdom

References

External links
Official Website
British Waterways' leisure website "Waterscape": listing for Aylesbury Canal Society
Aylesbury Vale District Council, acquisition of Aylesbury Canal Society moorings
Council received a £4.3 million grant from Department for Communities and Local Government to fund canal basin development
Visit Buckinghamshire website: listing for Aylesbury Canal Society
A Journey down the Aylesbury Arm - photo website

Canals in Buckinghamshire
Waterways organisations in England
Aylesbury